Zabargad Island (also known as St. John's Island in English) is the largest of a group of islands in Foul Bay, Egypt. It is not a quaternary volcanic island, but rather is believed to be an upthrusted part of upper mantle material. The nearest island is known as "Rocky Island".

History
Before the mid 270s [BCE] Ptolemaic activity along the African coast of the Red Sea had been limited with few significant results other than the discovery of the 'topaz' deposits on the island of Gazirat Zabarjad southeast of Ras Banas. ... 2. Pliny, HN 37, 108 refers to a large topaz that was brought back to Egypt as a gift for Ptolemy I's queen Berenice I.

Geology

The island is considered geologically unique as it is uplifted mantle, a fragment of the sub-Red Sea lithosphere. Rocks on the island are mainly lower crustal igneous rocks. The island became present above sea level after African and Asiatic continental plates converged to cause rocks in the lower crust to be uplifted. The island contains three masses of peridotite, which are rich in the gemstone peridot (olivine). The island is believed to be the first discovered source of peridot, which was called topazios in ancient times, hence the Greek name for the island, Topazios. Layers of spinel-lherzolites with anhydrous Al-diopside pyroxenites and hydrous Cr-diopside pyroxenites can be found too on the island.

Pliny, XXXV, chap. 22 says that, according to Juba, the island "Topazus in the Red Sea", also had mines producing sandarach (realgar) and ochre, "but neither of them are imported to us from that place."

Nature
The island is part of the Elba National Park meaning the island is conserved. However, the island was closed to the public for one year due to damage to corals and the disturbance of birds who breed on the island.

Birds 
The island serves as a breeding ground for at least nine known species of birds. The most recent discovery was that of 150 pairs of sooty falcon (Falco concolor) in October, 1994.

Plantlife 
There is very little vegetation on the island due to the lack of soil.

Corals and sealife 
The corals surround the island and act as a barrier for the fish and other sea life which live among it. However, the corals recently became damaged due to increased tourist activity and the expansion of the diving industry on the island. The coral is located approximately 25 metres below the surface.

Fish that can be found within the nearby waters and corals are:
Rays
Moray eels
Octopus
Crocodilefish
Cuttlefish

Tourism

The island is  near coral reefs, which are a popular diving attraction for tourists. The diving industry on the island has increased as well as the tourism industry on the island in general resulting in construction of hotels and diving shelves. The beaches are often quiet and are relatively unspoilt by development. However, most tourists go to this island as a "stop-off" before going to Rocky Island in the south.

References

External links
St. John's Island peridot information and history at Mindat.org
Bird Life Information

Islands of Egypt
Islands of the Red Sea
Red Sea Governorate